George Washington is a statue of the first president of the United States by the same name located in Baltimore, Maryland. Erected in 1857 in, the sculpture is located at the main entrance of Druid Hill Park.

History
Created by famed sculptor Edward Sheffield Bartholomew, the George Washington statue was relocated to Druid Hill Park in 1885. It was moved from old Carroll Hall building at the southwest corner of Calvert and Baltimore Streets.

In June 2020, the historic statue was defaced with red paint and vandalized with graffiti in response to the murder of George Floyd.

See also
 
 List of public art in Baltimore
 List of statues of George Washington
 List of sculptures of presidents of the United States

References

Buildings and structures completed in 1857
Buildings and structures in Baltimore
Monuments and memorials to George Washington in the United States
Outdoor sculptures in Maryland
Relocated buildings and structures in Maryland
Statues in Maryland
Statues of George Washington
Vandalized works of art in Maryland